Kombai is a panchayat town in Theni District in the Indian state of Tamil Nadu, located in the beautiful foot hills of Western Ghats, blessed by mother nature with all pancha boota - Land, Water, Fire, Air and Ether. The town is known for its splendid nature, culture, diversity and ethnicity, history, landmarks and flourishing transformation. 

Kombai is also well known for dogs. Kombai dog and Rajapalayam dog are also employed in police department.

Agriculture is the main occupation of this village. Many people working as police profession, software industry, cinema industry & own agri product export.

Geography

Topography  
Kombai has an average elevation of 399 metres (1309 feet). The village is situated near Western Ghats and is surrounded by mountains. North Side- Pannaipuram, East Side-Salamalai hills, West Side-Kerala border hills, South Side-Uthamapalayam town. Two mountain called Ramakkal mettu hills situated in west side & Salamali hills situated in east side.

Climate  
It has a cold weather almost throughout the year.

Flora and Fauna  
The Kombai dog or Polygar dog is a breed of sighthound native to Tamil Nadu in Southern India. Traditionally kept for hunting, they also have a reputation for making excellent guard dogs.

Kombai dog and Rajapalayam dog are also employed in police department.

Demographics

Population 
 India census, Kombai had a population of 12,820. Males constitute 50% of the population and females 50%. Kombai has an average literacy rate of 64%, higher than the national average of 59.5%: male literacy is 72%, and female literacy is 65%. In Kombai, 10% of the population is under 6 years of age.

Government and politics

Agriculture 
Most people living here cherish and focus on Agriculture and Farming as their primary business. The Farmers primarily focus on growing Coconuts and Tamarind, making it one of the largest producers of these items in the region. The farmers grow also seasonal vegetables such as beans, ground nuts, snake guard, etc. Other plantations include Banana, Guava, Mango, etc.

Culture/Cityscape 

Kombai is known for its diversity and inclusion. its having famous marimman temple & Renganathar temples. Every year Tamil month cithirai they are celebrating mariamman kovil festival for one week. Every year Tamil month purattasi they are celebrating ranganathar kovil festival for one month in every Saturday. Surrounding villagers also come & celebrates this festival in grand manner.

Kombai Ratham (car) is very famous after sri villiputhur ratham. This ratham festival celebrated by 18 villages jointly in grand manner.

Transport

By Rail  
Madurai to Bodi Nayakkanur
Bodi Nayakkanur to Kombai

By Road  
There are two routes to reach Kombai from Theni. Both takes 1 hour 30 minutes to reach Kombai.
1. Theni-veerabandi-cinnamanoor-uthamapalayam-kombai
2. Theni-bodi-Thevaram-Kombai

Notable people 

 Ramachandran Durairaj - actor
 Ilayaraja - composer. studied at Sri Kannika Parameshwari Middle School.

References

Cities and towns in Theni district